Janice Zamora Salimbangon is a Filipino politician serving as the representative for the 4th district of Cebu since 2019. She is the widow of Benhur Salimbangon who also served as the representative of the said district.

Political career 
She was already presumed to succeed her husband who was on his third and final term as representative of Cebu's 4th district. On October 14, 2018, she filed her certificate of candidacy for the said position where she went against former Bogo mayor Celestino Martinez Jr. She defeated Martinez in the 2019 elections.

She is currently serving as a vice chairperson of the Committee on Aquaculture and Fisheries Resources.

Among the bills filed by Salimbangon as representative were the renaming of the Bogo-Curva-Medellin-Daanbantayan-Maya Road into Juan Macaraeg Highway, removing Bantayan Island from the wilderness protected zone category, and rationalizing the management of resources on Malapascua Island. She also voted in favor of House Bill No. 6875 which later became the Anti-Terrorism Act of 2020 saying that she is "totally against terrorism."

Electoral history

House of Representatives

Personal life 
Salimbangon was married to Benhur Salimbangon, who was from Medellin, Cebu, to which they had seven children. Her husband died on December 24, 2020, at the age of 75. Their daughter, Daphne, ran as vice governor in the 2019 elections but was defeated by then outgoing governor Hilario Davide III.

References

External links 
 
 Congressional Profile

People from Cebu
Members of the House of Representatives of the Philippines from Cebu
National Unity Party (Philippines) politicians
Living people
Cebuano people
21st-century Filipino politicians
Year of birth missing (living people)